Salvazana is a monotypic genus of Asian cicadas in the tribe Cryptotympanini.  The single species Salvazana mirabilis is recorded from Indochina: to date, specifically Thailand and Vietnam.

References

External links

Cicadas
Hemiptera of Asia
Monotypic Hemiptera genera